The number of animated series with LGBTQ characters, from 2005 to 2009, changed from those aired from 2000 to 2004, with the addition of various LGBTQ characters in Western animation. In the latter case, this included characters in series such as Moral Orel, American Dad!, The Cleveland Show, Superjail!, and Archer. Even so, most of the LGBTQ characters still appeared in anime. Prominently, LGBTQ characters appeared in Kashimashi: Girl Meets Girl, Simoun, Strawberry Panic!, Canaan, Kanamemo, Sweet Blue Flowers, and Whispered Words.

This list only includes recurring characters, otherwise known as supporting characters, which appear frequently from time to time during the series' run, often playing major roles in more than one episode, and those in the main cast are listed below. LGBTQ characters which are guest stars or one-off characters are listed on the pages focusing exclusively on gay (in animation and anime), lesbian (in animation and anime), bisexual (in animation and anime), trans, pansexual, asexual, non-binary, and intersex characters.

For a further understanding of how these LGBTQ characters fit into the overall history of animation, see the History of LGBTQ characters in animated series: 2000s page.

The entries on this page are organized alphanumerically by duration dates and then alphabetically by the first letter of a specific series.

2005

2006

2007

2008

2009

See also
 List of yuri anime and manga
 List of LGBT-related films by year
 list of animated films with LGBT characters.

Notes

References

Citations

Sources
 
 
 
 
 

2000s animated television series
2000s-related lists
Animated
Lists of animated series